is the head coach of the Aomori Wat's in the Japanese B.League.

Head coaching record

|- 
| style="text-align:left;"|Aomori Wat's
| style="text-align:left;"|2018
| 22||9||13|||| style="text-align:center;"|5th in B2 Eastern|||-||-||-||
| style="text-align:center;"|-
|-
| style="text-align:left;"|Aomori Wat's
| style="text-align:left;"|2018-19
| 60||15||45|||| style="text-align:center;"| 6th in B2 Eastern|||-||-||-||
| style="text-align:center;"|-
|-
| style="text-align:left;"|Aomori Wat's
| style="text-align:left;"|2019-20
| 47||21||26|||| style="text-align:center;"| 4th in B2 Eastern|||-||-||-||
| style="text-align:center;"|-
|-

References

1980 births
Living people
Aomori Wat's coaches
Japanese basketball coaches